Bae Se Hwa (배세화) (born 1980 in Seoul, South Korea) is a South Korean artist. He is famous for working with steam bent walnut wood to create fluid and elegant curves in his artwork.   Bae's inspiration comes from traditional Korean's interpretation of beauty and the harmony of nature. Bae attended Hongik University in Seoul, and received his BFA in Woodworking & Furniture Design.

Works

Selected exhibitions 
 2015 Korea now! Design, Craft, Fashion and Graphic Design in Korea exhibition, Musée des Arts décoratifs, Paris, France
 2015 Living In Art II, Connect, Seomi International, Los Angeles, CA, USA
 2015 Living In Art I, Let's Art, Seomi International, Los Angeles, CA, USA
 2013 Contemporary Korean Design 2, R20th Century Gallery, New York
 2011 Bae Se Hwa, Steam Series, Haunch of Venison, London
 2010 Beyond the Ceramics, Icheon World Ceramic Center, Icheon
 Show Hand-Arty Fair, Hillstate Gallery, Seoul
 10/10, Dong-dae-mun Design Plaza & Park Gallery, Seoul 
 Korea –Canada Craft, Vancouver
 2009 Indoor Design for Life, Clayarch, Seoul
 Seoul Design Festival, COEX, Seoul 
 Korea Tomorrow, SETEC, Seoul 
 Cheongju International Craft Biennale 2009, Cheongju
 Design Cube, Seoul  
 DMY-design my youngster, Arena, Berlin 
 2008 Lighting Design Collection, Raemian Gallery, Seoul 
 Som Ri Culture & Arts Hall, Ik-san
 Nipponlife2008 
 Japanese Wooden Furniture and Living Equipment, Tokyo
 Seoul Design Olympiad, Seoul
 Gana Art Center/Craftshop, Seoul
 Seoul Design Festival, COEX, Seoul 
 Asahikawa Furniture Center, Asahikawa

Awards 
 2009 Gold Prize, Gyeong’gi Furniture Competition, Korea 
 2008 Special Prize, The Steering Committee of Korea Arts and Crafts, Korea
 Hong-Rim Prize, Korea 
 Silverleaf, International Furniture Design Fair Ahsahikawa, Japan 
 Most wanted, Living Design Awards, Korea 
 2006 Winner, Furniture Guide Competition, Korea 
 Silver Prize, Gyeong’gi Furniture Competition, Korea
 2005 Finalist, Cheongju International Furniture Competition, Korea

Collections 
 Amore Pacific Museum, Korea
 CJ, Korea
 Green Cross, Korea
 FAIRS
 2013  Design Miami/Basel, Basel Design Days Dubai, Dubai, Design Miami/Miami
 2012 Design Miami/, MiamiPAD, Pavilion of Art & Design, LondonDesign Miami/Basel, Basel
 2011 Design Miami/, MiamiDesign Miami/Basel, Basel
 2010 Design Miami/, MiamiDesign Miami/Basel, BaselSeoul Living Design Fair, COEX, Seoul
 2009 KIAF/Korea International Art Fair, COEX, Seoul Design Fair Sol-Sol, COEX, SeoulKorea Art Gallery Fair, BEXCO, BusanSeoul Auction Show, COEX, by Gallery SEOMI, Seoul Fuori Salone, Milan
 2008 Craft Trend Fair, COEX, SeoulSeoul Living Design Fair, COEX, Seoul
 2006 Seoul Living Design Fair, COEX, SeoulCraft Fair, COEX, Seoul Seoul Home Deco, COEX, SeoulKofurn, Kintex, Gyeong’gi

References

External links
 Official website

South Korean artists
1980 births
Living people
Artists from Seoul
Hongik University alumni